In aviation, a jump seat or jumpseat is an auxiliary seat for individuals—other than normal passengers—who are not operating the aircraft. In general, the term 'jump seat' can also refer to a seat in any type of vehicle which can fold up out of the way; vehicles include carriages, automobiles, vans, buses, fire tenders, and taxicabs. The term originated in the United States c. 1860 for a movable carriage seat.

In land vehicles 

Jump seats originated in horse-drawn carriages.

Jump seats were features of many early automobiles, but are now rare, present mainly in limousines. They are also used in UPS delivery vans.

Some pickup trucks also employ jump seats, particularly those with an extended cab which don't have room for full rear passenger seats. These seats are often mounted against the side of the cab interior and fold up when not in use.

In airplanes 
In airplanes, jump seats—which are officially termed auxiliary crew stations—can be located in the flight deck. In cockpits, jump seats are provided for individuals who are not operating the aircraft. These might include trainee pilots, off-duty crew members in transition to another airport (see deadheading), government officials (such as Federal Aviation Administration staff), or airline staff. The passenger cabin jump seats are used by the cabin crew, especially during takeoff and landing. These jump seats are normally located near emergency exits so that flight attendants can quickly open the exit door for an emergency evacuation. The passenger cabin jump seats usually fold out of the way when not in use to keep aisles, workspaces, and emergency exits clear.

Some airplanes do not have jump seats in the cockpit, while others have one or two. In most airliners, the observers' seats have an audio selector panel so that the observer can monitor or participate in flight communications. An oxygen mask is provided for each station. There can be extra flight attendant jump seats in the main cabin, depending on how the airline has configured its aircraft and how many on-duty flight attendants are staffed. Both types might be stand-alone seats, or folding. Either type of jump seat may sometimes be used by off-duty staff (or an employee of another airline or other person) engaging in non-revenue travel, when no passenger seats are available in the cabin (a practice known as jumpseating). Increased security requirements for the flight deck since September 11, 2001, have meant a tightening of restrictions on who is allowed to use jump seats.

See also

 Fold down seating
 Folding chair
 Folding seat
 List of seats
 Rumble seat

References

External links

 The Jump Seat

1860 introductions
Aircraft cabin components
Vehicle parts
Auto parts
Carriages
Seats